Semicassis undulata is a Mediterranean species of medium-sized sea snail, a marine gastropod mollusc in the subfamily Cassinae, the helmet snails and bonnet snails.

Taxonomy
This taxon was previously sometimes referred to at subspecies level as Semicassis granulata undulata, but in 2019, the World Register of Marine Species lists this Mediterranean taxon as a separate species from Semicassis granulata, which is a Western Atlantic taxon.

Distribution
This species occurs in the Mediterranean Sea and in the Atlantic Ocean off Northwest Africa and the Macaronesian Islands.

References

 Kreipl K. 1997. Recent Cassidae. Christa Hemmen, Wiesbaden, 151 p. page(s): 55

Cassidae
Gastropods described in 1791
Taxa named by Johann Friedrich Gmelin